The 1996 Florida Gators football team represented the University of Florida in the sport of American football during the 1996 NCAA Division I-A football season. The 1996 season was the team's seventh under head coach Steve Spurrier. The Gators competed in the Southeastern Conference (SEC) and played their home games at Ben Hill Griffin Stadium on the university's Gainesville, Florida campus.

The Gators posted a 12–1 record and won their fifth consecutive SEC Eastern Division title, their fourth straight SEC Championship Game, and their first national championship in team history, with a 52–20 Sugar Bowl rout of their in-state rivals, the Florida State Seminoles.

The Gators used coach Spurrier's pass-heavy "fun 'n gun" offense". Quarterback Danny Wuerffel won the Heisman Trophy. Wuerffel as well as his wide receivers Ike Hilliard and Reidel Anthony were consensus All-Americans.

The Gators outscored their opponents 612–228.

Before the season
The Gators started the season ranked fourth as they aimed for a fourth consecutive SEC title.

Schedule

Season summary

Southwestern Louisiana

In the season opener at the Swamp, Florida beat Southwestern Louisiana 55–21.

Bob Stoops's Gator defense held the Cajuns scoreless in the first half,  and scored four touchdowns (as much as the offense). Cornerback Fred Weary himself accounted for two touchdowns.

Georgia Southern

In the second week of play, the Gators romped with a 62–14 defeat of Georgia Southern.

The defense underperformed, giving up 311 yards to Georgia Southern's flexbone attack.

Tennessee

The third game was a showdown between No. 4 Florida and No. 2 Tennessee.  Volunteers quarterback Peyton Manning had not beaten the Gators in two previous attempts, and after a second-half meltdown a year earlier in Gainesville, the Volunteers were looking to exact revenge on their SEC East rival in Knoxville.  The game featured two of the top quarterbacks in college football, Manning and Florida's Danny Wuerffel.  Both teams featured strong aerial attacks, but Florida's Fred Taylor and Tennessee's Jay Graham were among the SEC's best tailbacks.  ESPN's College Gameday was on hand to broadcast their pregame show live from Knoxville.

The tone for the game was set on Florida's first drive, as Spurrier spurned the punt team on a 4th and 10 from the UT 35, and Wuerffel connected with Reidel Anthony for a touchdown to put the Gators up 7–0.  Teako Brown intercepted Manning on the Volunteers' first drive, and it took Wuerffel only one play to find the end zone again, hitting Terry Jackson from  out to extend the lead to 14–0.  Florida doubled their lead in a 52-second stretch early in the 2nd quarter, as Ike Hilliard and Jacquez Green became the third and fourth different receivers with touchdown receptions on the afternoon, sandwiched around a James Bates interception of Manning.  Anthone Lott's  fumble return stretched the lead to 35–0, before Manning finally got the Vols on the scoreboard before halftime on a  strike to Peerless Price.

With Florida switching to a more conservative offensive game plan in the second half, Manning cut the lead to 35–22 with 8 minutes left with 2 more touchdown tosses, including a second to Price. Andy McCellough's  reception brought the Vols within 35–29 with 10 seconds to play, but Florida recovered the ensuing onside kick to hang on for a six-point win on a rainy Knoxville afternoon.

Kentucky

Coming off a big win in Knoxville the week before and being ranked #1 for the first time since 1994, the Gators were looking for somewhat of an easy home game against the Kentucky Wildcats. This would prove true as the Gators posted their first shutout since a 31–0 drubbing of Tennessee in Knoxville in 1994, with Florida defeating Kentucky 65–0.

The Gators scored just 63 seconds into the game with a touchdown pass from Danny Wuerffel to Ike Hilliard. Wuerffel would have 3 touchdown passes in all, but the day belonged to Jacquez Green. In the 3rd quarter, Green took a punt back for a touchdown. On Kentucky's next possession, they would punt again and Green, who was still breathing heavy from his first return, weaved his way for another score. In all, the Gators amassed over 300 return yards from punts and kickoffs. Fred Taylor made his season debut with 45 yards on six attempts.

Arkansas
 

Florida traveled to Fayetteville and beat Arkansas 42–7. The Gators had an abysmal second quarter, but recovered and Danny Wuerffel threw for a then-school record of 462 yards.

A defensive stand and missed field goal by Arkansas to start the second half "jolted the Gators back to life." Wuerffel then passed for three touchdowns.

LSU

With Florida winning so convincingly all season, the next two weeks might have proved a challenge for the Gators, with #12 LSU and #16 Auburn coming to town. It was business as usual for the Gators.  The Gators proved themselves worthy of the #1 ranking as they first thumped the LSU Tigers 56–13.

LSU came in undefeated on the campaign and featured an offense that scored 38 points per game. Florida, however, was not thinking upset, as Danny Wuerffel threw three touchdowns, two of them to Ike Hilliard, and ran for another score as the Gators proved to have the better offense. Fred Taylor had a breakout game, running for 107 yards on 16 carries.

Their defense came to play as well as they forced two turnovers and recorded 7 sacks and held the LSU offense to just 28 rushing yards.

Auburn

Next was another ranked team, as 16th ranked Auburn came to Gainesville. The first half may have been closer than most would have expected, as Auburn kicked a field goal late to trail just 21–10. But that would be it for the Tigers as the Gators reeled off 30 unanswered points en route to a 51–10 win.

Like the LSU game, the Gators scored quick and often, amassing over 600 yards of offense and holding Auburn to just 173 yards. Danny Wuerffel again threw for 3 touchdowns and ran for another for the red-hot Florida offense. Taylor ran for 110 yards on 14 carries.

Georgia

Top ranked Florida was coming in looking to win its 7th consecutive game against Georgia in the World's Largest Outdoor Cocktail Party. At the end of the day, Alltel Stadium was half teal (teal seats in the stadium) and half orange and blue as the Gators won 47–7. By this point in the season, Florida was bruising their opponents by an average score of 52–12.

Danny Wuerffel again would have an outstanding game, bolstering his Heisman Trophy candidacy, with 279 yards passing and 4 touchdowns. The Gators also amassed over 200 yards rushing. The Gator defense held the Dawgs to just 272 yards and one touchdown on the day.

Vanderbilt

Hampered by penalties throughout, the Gators survived a scare with the Vanderbilt Commodores in Nashville 28–21.

After an injury to tackle Zach Piller, Vanderbilt sacked and stripped Danny Wuerffel, and Jamie Duncan returned the fumble for a touchdown. A 2-point conversion on a pass to Todd Yoder brought the score to 28–14 and inspired the Commodores. Early in the fourth quarter, Vanderbilt back Jason Dunnavant broke off a 34-yard touchdown run and the score was 28–21. Vanderbilt missed a field goal, and one final drive was stopped at its own 47-yard line.

Overcoming five sacks, Wuerffel passed for 283 yards and four touchdowns.

South Carolina

The Gators struggled despite a 52–25 win over the South Carolina Gamecocks. Wuerffel had an off-day, especially late, and never failed to find a passing rhythm; but was helped by Fred Taylor to lift Florida over the Gamecocks. Spurrier became the Gators' all-time winningest coach, surpassing Ray Graves' 70 career wins. Spurrier gave Graves a game ball, who gave a talk to the team.

Early on in the game, Wuerffel threw a 56-yard touchdown pass to Jacquez Green and a 52-yard touchdown pass to Reidel Anthony. Taylor ran for 139 yards and three touchdowns on 21 carries on the day.

Florida State

The rival Florida State Seminoles defeated the Gators 24–21, seemingly ending Florida's chance at a national title. For the first time in series history, both squads were an undefeated 10–0. The Seminoles scored 17 straight points in the first quarter and Warrick Dunn rushed for a career-best 185 yards.

The Seminoles also had one of the best defenses in the nation, with a savage pass rush which included All-Americans Peter Boulware and Reinard Wilson. The Seminoles had been flagged for roughing the passer twice during the game, and Spurrier had the UF video staff compile footage which he claimed showed FSU players tackling Wuerffel late a half-dozen additional times. Gator receiver  Reidel Anthony still managed career bests in receptions (11) and yards gained (193). "If Danny would have had more time, we would have killed them. I was getting past them all the time with all kinds of routes." Florida had 443 yards of offense, but Wuerffel threw three interceptions and was sacked six times.

The third quarter was scoreless as both teams played well on defense. FSU's "Pooh Bear" Williams got the ball into the endzone to put the Seminoles up 24–14 midway through the fourth quarter. Down late, Florida went 80 yards in eight plays, including a 31-yard pass to Anthony, down to the 3-yard line. A short pass to Anthony brought Florida within a field goal with just over a minute left. The subsequent onside kick went out of bounds, and the game was sealed when Dunn ran for a first down. Spurrier continued to complain to the press about the late hits while FSU coach Bobby Bowden responded that he thought the hits in question were clean while admitting that "we just hit to the echo (of the whistle), instead of the whistle."

Postseason

Alabama

The Gators beat the Alabama Crimson Tide 45–30 in the SEC Championship, as Wuerffel passed for six touchdowns. A 94-yard touchdown pass from Alabama to pull within 3 was answered by an 85-yard touchdown to Jacquez Green.

Texas also upset Nebraska in the inaugural Big 12 Championship, securing the Gators a spot in the Sugar Bowl.  To have a shot at a national title, the Gators needed Ohio State to beat second-ranked Arizona State—the only team to go through the regular season undefeated—in the Rose Bowl, which they did on the final play of the game, setting up the Sugar Bowl as the Bowl Alliance national championship game.

Florida State

The Gators used the shotgun formation to give Wuerffel more time to throw and defeated FSU in a rematch 52–20, for their first national title.

Hilliard scored once on a "stop and pop" where he stopped on a dime to avoid Seminole defenders, then ran into the endzone.  A 42-yard Terry Jackson touchdown run sealed the victory.

Awards and honors

National award winners
Along with a national title, quarterback Danny Wuerffel was awarded the Heisman Trophy, annually awarded to college football's top player. He was also awarded the Maxwell Award, Walter Camp Award, Davey O'Brien Award, Johnny Unitas Golden Arm Award, as well as the Draddy Trophy, National Football Foundation and College Hall of Fame Scholar, and College Football Association Scholar-Athlete Team. Lawrence Wright won the Jim Thorpe Award, and was on the College Football Association Scholar-Athlete Team. Jeff Mitchell was an Outland Trophy semi-finalist.

Wuerffel, Ike Hilliard, and Reidel Anthony all were consensus All-Americans.

NFL draft
Ike Hilliard was selected 7th overall by the New York Giants, and Reidel Anthony was selected 16th by the Tampa Bay Buccaneers

Personnel

Depth chart

Roster

Coaching staff
 Steve Spurrier (Florida '67)- Head Coach
 Rod Broadway (North Carolina '77) – Defensive tackles
 Jim Collins (Elon College '74) – Recruiting Coordinator, Will and Mike Linebackers
 Dwayne Dixon (Florida '85) – Assistant Head Coach, Wide receivers
 Carl Franks (Duke '82) – Assistant Offensive Coordinator, Running backs
 Lawson Holland (Clemson '76) – Tight ends
 Bob Sanders (Davidson '76) – Assistant Defensive Coordinator, Defensive Ends
 Jimmy Ray Stephens (Florida '77) – Offensive line
 Bob Stoops (Iowa '83) – Assistant Head Coach, Defensive Coordinator, Secondary
 Barry Wilson (Georgia '65) – Special Teams Coordinator, Sam Linebackers

Team statistics

Scores by quarter

Player statistics

Offense

Rushing

Passing

Receiving

Defense

Defense statistics reflect regular season games only

Special teams

Kicking

Returns

Notes

References

Florida
Florida Gators football seasons
College football national champions
Southeastern Conference football champion seasons
Sugar Bowl champion seasons
Florida Gators football